North Dakota Highway 127 (ND 127) is a  north–south state highway in the U.S. state of North Dakota. ND 127's southern terminus is a continuation as South Dakota Highway 127 (SD 127) at the South Dakota/ North Dakota border, and the northern terminus is at ND 13 in Wahpeton.

Major intersections

Gallery

References

127
Transportation in Richland County, North Dakota